South Bentinck is a locality on South Bentinck Arm in the Central Coast region of British Columbia, Canada, located on the north side of the mouth of the Noeick River on the east shore of that inlet.

See also
List of communities in British Columbia

References

Central Coast of British Columbia
Unincorporated settlements in British Columbia